Mikhaylovka is a rural locality (a village) in Novonadezhdinsky Selsoviet, Blagoveshchensky District, Bashkortostan, Russia. The population was 10 as of 2010. There is 1 street.

Geography 
Mikhaylovka is located 49 km northeast of Blagoveshchensk (the district's administrative centre) by road.

References 

Rural localities in Blagoveshchensky District